Bastilla circumsignata is a moth of the family Noctuidae. It is found in the north-eastern parts of the Himalaya, Sumatra, Java and Borneo.

References

External links
Species info

Bastilla (moth)
Moths described in 1852